The Fortune Cookie (alternative UK title: Meet Whiplash Willie) is a 1966 American black comedy film directed, produced and co-written by Billy Wilder. It was the first film in which Jack Lemmon collaborated with Walter Matthau.  Matthau won an Academy Award for Best Supporting Actor for his performance.

Plot
CBS cameraman Harry Hinkle is injured, when football player Luther "Boom Boom" Jackson of the Cleveland Browns runs into him during a home game at Municipal Stadium. Harry's injuries are minor, but his conniving lawyer brother-in-law William H. "Whiplash Willie" Gingrich convinces him to pretend that his leg and hand have been partially paralyzed, so they can receive a huge indemnity from the insurance company.

Harry reluctantly goes along with the scheme because he is still in love with his ex-wife, Sandy, and being injured might bring her back. The insurance company's lawyers at O'Brien, Thompson and Kincaid suspect that the paralysis is a fake, but all but one of their medical experts say that it is real.  The experts are convinced by the remnants of a compressed vertebra (in fact, Hinkle suffered the injury as a child), and Hinkle's responses, helped by the numbing shots of novocaine Gingrich has had a paroled dentist give him. The one holdout, Swiss Professor Winterhalter, is convinced that Hinkle is a fake. With no medical evidence to base their case on, O'Brien, Thompson and Kincaid hire Cleveland's best private detective, Chester Purkey, to keep Hinkle under constant surveillance. However, Gingrich sees Purkey entering the apartment building across the street and lets Hinkle know they are being watched and recorded - and after Sandy arrives, warns him not to indulge in any hanky panky with her. He proceeds to feed misinformation to Purkey; he incorporates the "Harry Hinkle Foundation", a non-profit charity to which all the proceeds of any settlement are to go, above and beyond the medical expenses. When Sandy questions Gingrich about this in private, he tells her that it is just a scam to put pressure on the insurance company to settle, and that there will be enough money in the settlement for everyone. Hinkle begins to enjoy having Sandy back again, but he feels bad when he sees that Boom-Boom is so guilt-ridden, his performance on the field suffers; he is booed by the fans and then grounded by the team for getting drunk and involved in a bar fight.

Hinkle wants Gingrich to represent Boom-Boom, but to Hinkle's displeasure, Gingrich says he is too busy negotiating with O'Brien, Thompson & Kincaid. Hinkle learns Sandy has returned to him strictly out of greed. Hinkle obtains a $200,000 settlement check. However, Purkey has a plan to expose the scam. He shows up at the apartment supposedly to collect his microphones. He begins to make racist remarks about Boom-Boom and "our black brothers" getting out of hand. Hinkle, incensed, jumps up out his wheelchair and decks Purkey, but Purkey's assistant Max is not sure he recorded it on film because "It's a little dark". Hinkle asks Purkey if he would like a second take, turns on a light and advises the cameraman how to set his exposure. He then punches Purkey again, and follows up by swinging from curtain rods and bouncing on the bed. Sandy is crawling on the floor looking for her lost contact lens, and just before he leaves the apartment, Hinkle roughly pushes her down to the ground with his foot. Gingrich claims he had no idea that his client was deceiving him, and announces his intention to sue the insurance company lawyers for invasion of privacy and report Purkey's racist remarks to various organizations. Hinkle drives to the stadium, where he finds Boom-Boom leaving the team and becoming a wrestler named "The Dark Angel". He manages to snap him out of the state, and the two run down the field passing a football back and forth between them.

Cast

Production

Lemmon originally had two other actors proposed to star with him – Frank Sinatra and Jackie Gleason – but Wilder insisted that he do the picture with Walter Matthau. Production on the film was halted for weeks after Walter Matthau had a heart attack. By the time Matthau was healthy enough to work, and filming started up again, he had slimmed down from 190 to 160 pounds and had to wear a heavy black coat and padded clothing to conceal the weight loss. 

Scenes were filmed during the Cleveland Browns' 27–17 loss to the Minnesota Vikings at Cleveland Stadium on the afternoon of October 31, 1965. According to The Saturday Evening Post, additional footage was shot the day after the game with Browns players as themselves and the Vikings. Luther "Boom Boom" Jackson's uniform number 44 was actually worn by Leroy Kelly, who was deemed "too small to pass for actor Ron Rich at close range" according to the Post. Ernie Green and a stunt performer both stood in for Rich, with the latter only for the sideline collision scene. A third consecutive day of shooting had the Kent State University freshman football team replacing the Browns, who were unavailable due to beginning preparations for their next opponent.

Saint Mark's Hospital in the film is the newly completed St. Vincent Charity Hospital, a curved building considered ultramodern at that time. An exterior scene was filmed on East 24th Street outside an older section of the hospital. Terminal Tower served as the exterior of the law firm. In one scene, one can see Erieview Tower and the steel skeleton of the Anthony J. Celebrezze Federal Building under construction.

Reception
Vincent Canby of The New York Times called the film, "a fine, dark, gag-filled hallucination, peopled by dropouts from the Great Society" and "an explosively funny live-action cartoon about petty chiselers who regard the economic system as a giant pinball machine, ready to pay off to anyone who tilts it properly."

Variety found the film "generally amusing (often wildly so), but overlong."

The Hollywood Reporter asserted that The Fortune Cookie was "Billy Wilder's best picture since The Apartment, his funniest since Some Like it Hot."

Box office
The film, grossed $6,000,000 at the North American box office, making it the 23rd highest-grossing film of 1966. The film earned $6.8 million worldwide.

Accolades

See also
List of American films of 1966

References
Notes

External links

 
 
 
 
 

1966 films
1960s black comedy films
1966 comedy films
American black-and-white films
American black comedy films
American satirical films
Cleveland Browns
1960s English-language films
Films scored by André Previn
Films directed by Billy Wilder
Films featuring a Best Supporting Actor Academy Award-winning performance
Films set in Cleveland
Films shot in Cleveland
Films with screenplays by Billy Wilder
Films with screenplays by I. A. L. Diamond
United Artists films
1960s American films